A Loss of Innocence (also known as The End of Eden) is a 1996 American romantic drama television film that first aired on September 29, 1996, on the ABC television network. It is based on the novel On This Star by Virginia Sorensen.

Plot
In the 1920s, a successful New York pianist returns to his hometown of Templeton, a Mormon community in rural Utah. After he arrives, Erik Eriksen is treated distrustfully by the community members, including his family, for having "betrayed" them by not living his life according to their faith. Only his mother and his younger half-brother, Jens, support him unconditionally. However, trouble arises when Erik falls in love with Chelnicia. "Chel" is a beautiful young woman who not only plays the piano and is a dedicated Mormon, but also happens to be Jens's fiancée.

Cast
 Jennie Garth as Chelnicia "Chel" Bowen
 Rob Estes as Erik Eriksen
 Polly Holliday as Christina Eriksen
 Mike Doyle as Jens Eriksen
 Michael Milhoan as Ivor Eriksen
 Anne Sward as Ida Eriksen
 Scott Wilkinson as John Brown
 Marcia Dangerfield as Seenie
 Melissa Moore as Esther Bowen-Dorius
 Maria Mejias as Ruby Snow
 Bill Osborn as Oley Eriksen
 Peter Morse as Junior Eriksen
 Wendy Lee Richhart as Hedvig Eriksen
 Jed Knudsen as Karl Dorius
 Steve Anderson as Bill Mac
 Beverly Rowland as Woman on Train
 Reb Fleming as Seamstress
 Mary Pederson as Verla May
 Danny Rees as Justice of the Peace
 Allan Groves as Andy
 Dennis Saylor as Jake

Production
The film was shot mostly in Heber Valley, Utah.

Reception
Writing for Deseret News, Scott D. Pierce reviewed the film. He criticized its plot as predictable, saying that "the movie telegraphs its every move well in advance". Pierce also found fault with Garth's acting: "Why either brother is interested is somewhat of a mystery. As portrayed by Garth, Chel comes off as sort of a simple-minded fool." Conversely, he praised the film's overall feel, saying "Loss looks great - and not just the Utah scenery", adding that the period costumes bring "an air of authenticity to a movie that, unfortunately, is sometimes as foolish as it is predictable." Pierce summed up the film with the rhetorical question: "What if Danielle Steel had set one of her romance novels in 1920s Utah and used the LDS Church as a backdrop?" He ultimately concluded that "Loss is, in the end, a predictable romance novel brought to TV. It's difficult to take it any more seriously than that."

References

External links
 

1996 films
1996 television films
1996 romantic drama films
American romantic drama films
Films directed by Graeme Clifford
Films scored by Mark Snow
Mormonism in fiction
American drama television films
1990s English-language films
1990s American films